The 2014–15 Texas–Arlington Mavericks men's basketball team represented the University of Texas at Arlington during the 2014–15 NCAA Division I men's basketball season. The Mavericks, led by ninth year head coach Scott Cross, played their home games at the College Park Center and were a member of the Sun Belt Conference. The Mavericks finished the season 16–15, 10–10 in Sun Belt play to finish in fifth place. They lost in the first round of the Sun Belt tournament to Texas State.

Roster

Schedule

|-
!colspan=9 style="background:#0064b1; color:white;"| Regular season (non-conference play)

|-
!colspan=9 style="background:#0064b1; color:white;"| Regular season (Sun Belt Conference play)

|-
!colspan=9 style="background:#0064b1; color:white;"|Sun Belt tournament

See also
2014–15 Texas–Arlington Mavericks women's basketball team

References

UT Arlington Mavericks men's basketball seasons
Texas-Arlington
2014 in sports in Texas
2015 in sports in Texas